The 1999 Arab Cup Winners' Cup was the 10th edition of the Arab Cup Winners' Cup held in Kuwait City, Kuwait between 1 – 20 November 1999. The teams represented Arab nations from Africa and Asia.
Al-Ittihad from Qatar won the final against Al-Jaish from Syria for the first time.

Qualifying round
Qadsia SC (the hosts) and MC Oran (the holders) qualified automatically.

Zone 1 (Gulf Area)
Semifinals

Final

Al-Ittihad advanced to the final tournament.

Zone 2 (Red Sea)
Qualifying tournament held in Port Said, Egypt.

|-
!colspan=3|Day 1 

|-
!colspan=3|Day 2 

|-
!colspan=3|Day 3 

Al-Masry & Al-Riyadh SC advanced to the final tournament.

Zone 3 (North Africa)

ASC Air Mauritanie advanced to the final tournament.

Zone 4 (East Region)
Qualifying tournament held in Amman, Jordan.

|-
!colspan=3|Day 1 

|-
!colspan=3|Day 2 

|-
!colspan=3|Day 3 

Al-Faisaly & Al-Jaish advanced to the final tournament.

Group stage

Group A
ASC Air Mauritanie disqualified after arriving late.

Group B

Knock-out stage

Semi-finals

Final

Winners

References

External links
Arab Cup Winners' Cup 1999 - rsssf.com

1999
1999 in association football
International association football competitions hosted by Kuwait
1999 in Kuwaiti sport
2000 in Kuwaiti sport